John Epaminondas Laredo (13 February 1932 – 1 October 2000) was born 
in Pretoria, South Africa. He was brought up speaking Afrikaans and 
English, and later learned Zulu and several other languages.

In 1951, Laredo went to Stellenbosch University, followed by a master's in 
social anthropology at King's College, Cambridge. He returned to South 
Africa in 1958 with his wife Ursula Marx, lecturing in African studies at 
University of Cape Town.  He then moved to Durban in 1959 to undertake 
anthropological fieldwork in kwaZulu at Natal University, where he 
subsequently became a sociology lecturer.

John gradually became convinced that white rule was responsible for black poverty, and 
became active in the anti-apartheid movement.  Soon after the 
Sharpeville massacre in 1960, John, at that time head of social anthropology at 
Rhodes University, Port Elizabeth, was detained and interrogated for 110 days, 
under the "90-day" detention clause, and then jailed for five years.  Banned and 
house-arrested on his release, he went into exile in England.  From 1970-71, he 
was Resident Visiting Fellow at King's. He then joined the new 
Bradford University's sociology department.

His marriage to Ursula Marx broke down, but in 1986 he met Ailsa Swarbrick, an 
Open University lecturer who had lived in Tanzania, with whom he enjoyed 
great happiness for the rest of his life.  John suffered a heart attack in 1990, 
and he retired in 1993.  After the end of apartheid, he and Ailsa were able to 
revisit South Africa, and were honoured by an invitation to lunch with President 
Nelson Mandela.

John Laredo died suddenly in Leeds, UK, on 1 October 2000.

References

1932 births
2000 deaths
Stellenbosch University alumni
Alumni of King's College, Cambridge
People from Pretoria
Academic staff of the University of Cape Town
Academic staff of the University of Natal
Academic staff of Rhodes University
Academics of the University of Bradford
South African expatriates in the United Kingdom
Social anthropologists
Anti-apartheid activists